Metropolitan Macarius (secular name Mikhail Andreyevich Nevsky, ; October 1, 1835 in Shapkino, Vladimir Governorate, Russian Empire – March 2, 1926, Kotelniki, Moscow Governorate, Russian SFSR, Soviet Union) was the Metropolitan of Moscow and Kolomna from 1912 to 1917, an outstanding missionary and enlightener of the masses in the Altai region (people used to call him the "Siberian pillar of Orthodoxy" and "Apostle of the Altai").

Life 
Born to a family of a sexton, Macarius graduated from a theological seminary in Tobolsk (1854) and joined the Altai Mission, which had been set up by the Holy Synod with the purpose of converting the people of the Altay region to Christianity.

In 1861, Macarius took monastic vows and was ordained a hieromonk (monastic priest). From 1861 to 1864, he was busy restoring the Chulyshmansky Monastery to a normal state. In 1868–1869, Macarius lived in Kazan and worked on the grammar of the Altai language, publishing a number of divine service books in this language. In 1883, he was appointed head of the Altai Holy Mission and raised to the dignity of archmandrite, and then consecrated as Bishop of Biysk and vicar of the Tomsk eparchy. In 1891, Macarius was named Bishop of Tomsk and Semipalatinsk. In 1905, he became the Bishop of Tomsk and Barnaul (later, archbishop). In 1908, Macarius was appointed Archbishop of Tomsk and Altay.

In 1912, he was summoned to Moscow by the Holy Synod and elected Metropolitan of Moscow and Kolomna, also becoming thereby a member of the Holy Governing Synod. In 1913, Macarius became an honorable member of the St Petersburg Theological Academy. On March 20 of 1917, he retired from his post and was sent to Nikolo-Ugreshsky Monastery. Three years later, Metropolitan Tikhon bestowed upon Macarius the honorable lifelong title of Metropolitan of the Altai. Macarius died in 1926.

In 1956, Macarius' remains (still incorrupt, some say) were transferred to Sergiyev Posad and placed under the Dormition Cathedral of the Trinity-St. Sergius Lavra.

External links
Macarius II (Nevsky) of Moscow at OrthodoxWiki.

1835 births
1926 deaths
People from Ivanovo Oblast
People from Kovrovsky Uyezd
Metropolitans and Patriarchs of Moscow
Eastern Orthodox missionaries
Members of the Union of the Russian People
19th-century Eastern Orthodox bishops
20th-century Eastern Orthodox bishops
Translators of the Bible into Kazakh
20th-century translators
Missionary linguists